Wister is a town in Le Flore County, Oklahoma, United States. It is part of the Fort Smith metropolitan area. The population was 1,102 at the 2010 census. Wister is named for Gutman G. Wister, an official with the Choctaw, Oklahoma and Gulf Railroad.

History
A post office was established at Wister, Indian Territory, on June 30, 1890.  The community was named for an official of the Choctaw, Oklahoma and Gulf Railroad, one of the two railroads that intersected in the town.

At the time of its founding, Wister was located in Sugar Loaf County, a part of the Moshulatubbee District of the Choctaw Nation.

Until it became known as Wister, the settlement had been known as Wister Junction, due to its location at the crossing of two railroad routes.  The Choctaw, Oklahoma and Gulf Railroad was an east-west route linking Wister Junction with McAlester and passing through lucrative coal mining towns along the way.  Its eastern terminus was at the St. Louis and San Francisco Railroad, a north-south route connecting Fort Smith, Arkansas with Paris, Texas.  After receiving its post office, the town could no longer be known as Wister Junction, as federal post office regulations forbade new post offices from carrying descriptive names such as "Junction," "Mountain," or "Corner."

Geography

Wister is located on Lake Wister. Crappie, bass and catfish are the most frequently sought fish species in the lake. Along with fishing, Wister Lake also offers a wide variety of tourist activities such as camping, waterskiing, and swimming.

Demographics

As of the census of 2000, there were 1,002 people, 412 households, and 276 families residing in the town. The racial makeup of the town was 83.93% White, 11.18% Native American, 0.20% Asian, 0.10% from other races, and 4.59% from two or more races. Hispanics or Latinos of any race made up 2.20% of the population.

There were 412 households, out of which 28.9% had children under the age of 18 living with them, 49.3% were married couples living together, 12.6% had a female householder with no husband present, and 32.8% were non-families. 29.9% of all households were made up of individuals, and 16.0% had someone living alone who was 65 years of age or older. The average household size was 2.43, and the average family size was 2.99.

In the town, the population was spread out, with 27.0% under the age of 18, 8.5% from 18 to 24, 24.7% from 25 to 44, 21.3% from 45 to 64, and 18.6% who were 65 years of age or older. The median age was 37 years. For every 100 females, there were 98.0 males. For every 100 females age 18 and over, there were 87.0 males.

The median income for a household in the town was $20,602, and the median income for a family was $26,417. Males had a median income of $21,154 versus $15,556 for females. The per capita income for the town was $11,851. About 15.5% of families and 19.4% of the population were below the poverty line, including 26.3% of those under the age of 18 and 19.1% of those age 65 or over.

Education
Wister Public Schools operates public schools.

References

External links
 Wister Public Library
 Oklahoma Digital Maps: Digital Collections of Oklahoma and Indian Territory

Towns in LeFlore County, Oklahoma
Towns in Oklahoma
Fort Smith metropolitan area